The 1974 UK & Ireland Greyhound Racing Year was the 48th year of greyhound racing in the United Kingdom and Ireland.

Roll of honour

Summary
A black bitch called Westpark Mustard won the £300 Longcross Cup at White City in February at odds of 4-11, beating Heavy Sleeper and litter brother Westpark Onion by six lengths. It was the fifth successive victory by the bitch. She then completed ten wins in a row, when successful in the GRA stakes. The greyhound went on to record 15 successive victories before breaking into season on 12 May. Trained by Tom Johnston at Wembley she was homing in on Mick the Miller's record of 19. After seasonal rest her connections entered her for one off open races, deciding to avoid the Gold Collar and Cesarewitch. Five open race wins secured the new European record feat of 20 successive victories with the 20th win aptly named the Mick The Miller Record Stakes.

The annual National Greyhound Racing Club (NGRC) returns were released, with totalisator turnover at £63,950,885 and attendances recorded at 6,083,334.

Unbeknown to the industry the GRA Property Trust was on the verge of financial disaster due to the property slump, the company mismanagement continued with the securing of significant loans (Including £10 million from the ICI pension fund) in an attempt to maintain the share price, in addition to buying a 23% stake in the Coral Leisure Group, in the spring for £5.7 million.

Tracks
The GRA closed Clapton Stadium on 1 January, the Scurry Gold Cup competition was subsequently moved Slough Stadium. Rayleigh Weir Stadium also closed on 8 March.

Ipswich joined the NRGC banner under a new permit scheme and held their first race on 2 February; the track was under the control of Ernie Wedon who was also responsible with Len Franklin for Yarmouth stadium being constructed in 1940. Other independent tracks to follow suit during the year were Halifax (owned by Jack Wardman and Owlerton director Mr J Carter), Rye House (an independent since 1960) and Cambridge. Norton Canes and Watford switched to NGRC rules in the latter part of the year to complete a group of six. The Watford track was on the inside of Watford FC's ground and was promoted by the GRA; it attracted Barbara Tompkins as a trainer and soon became a Bookmakers Afternoon Greyhound Service (BAGS). Ultimately the NGRC were disappointed that only six independents took advantage of the new licensing available. Cambridge reverted to an independent after just five months after promoter Laurie Boost claimed that the tracks costs had increased. Independent track Newton Abbott had their grand opening on 2 May, the track sited on the national hunt racecourse itself featured a grandstand that could be dismantled when horse racing takes place.

News
Former Clapton Racing Manager Hugh Richardson became GRA's chief Racing Manager whilst trainers Adam Jackson and Tom Foster moved to White City. The closures of tracks forced trainers Kenric Appleton, Jim Sherry, Charlie Smoothy, Margaret Barker and Don Thornton into early retirement. However Thornton would join Maidstone two years later.

Two Wimbledon trainers retired, Paddy McEllistrim and Stan Martin, they were replaced by Paddy's daughter Norah and Sam Sykes a former head lad to Clare Orton. Owlerton's Ted Brennan also retired after 43-year career and was replaced by Harry Crapper. Further trainer changes saw David Kinchett join White City from Shawfield and Jim Cremin became an Assistant Racing Manager at Brighton under Peter Shotton. Tony Smith became  Willenhall Racing Manager after moving from Leeds.

The Retired Greyhound Trust was formed with the task of finding homes for ex racers and Con Stevens resigned from the board of directors at Wimbledon bringing to an end his 46 years of association with the track.

Jim Layton became Racing Manager at Catford Stadium and Victor Chandler Sr. died leaving a 20% stake of Walthamstow Stadium to Victor Chandler Jr.

Competitions
Patricias Hope failed in an attempt to become the first greyhound to win three English Greyhound Derby's. A greyhound called Volvo won the Mount Vernon Derby earning £450, a remarkable figure for an independent track. The year's major winners were overshadowed by the exploits of Westpark Mustard.

Ireland
Dunmore and Celtic Park endured serious disruptions due to the troubles in Belfast. The National power was continuing in Britain and Ireland and many tracks were in crisis, the 1973 ban on floodlighting continued into 1974 and many tracks had to purchase a generator. Derry in Northern Ireland came closest to closing after being unable to maintain racing in the afternoon.

After travelling to Shelbourne Park, Westpark Mustard's run of 20 wins was ended when beaten by Tommy Astaire.

Principal UK races

Totalisator returns

The totalisator returns declared to the licensing authorities for the year 1974 are listed below.

References 

Greyhound racing in the United Kingdom
Greyhound racing in the Republic of Ireland
UK and Ireland Greyhound Racing Year
UK and Ireland Greyhound Racing Year
UK and Ireland Greyhound Racing Year
UK and Ireland Greyhound Racing Year